Albania has participated in the Turkvision Song Contest 3 times since their debut in the  contest in Kazan, Tatarstan, Russia. Radio Televizioni Shqiptar (RTSH) have been responsible for the selection process of their participants since their debut in 2014. Xhoi Bejko was the first representative for Albania at the Turkvision Song Contest 2014 with the song "Hava ve Ates", which failed to qualify from the semi-finals, finishing in nineteenth place and achieving 154 points. Albania continued to participate in the contest, and sent Xhoi Bejko and Visar Rexhepi as their representatives in the Turkvision Song Contest 2015, with the song "Adi Hasret", which finished in eighth place, receiving the same total of points as in their previous participation.

Origins of the contest
Turkvision is an annual song contest which was created by TÜRKSOY in cooperation with the Turkish music channel TMB TV. Based on the similar format of the Eurovision Song Contest, Turkvision focuses primarily on participating Turkic countries and regions. The participating countries and regions have to take part in the Semi Final. A juror from each nation awards between 1 and 10 points for every entry, except their own. An amount of 12 to 15 nations qualify for the Grand Final where the jury determines the winner. TÜRKSOY has stated that televoting is going to be introduced in the future. Unlike the Eurovision Song Contest in which the winning country proceeds to host the following year's event, hosting of the Turkvision Song Contest takes place in the country or region that is also hosting the Turkish Capital of Culture.

History

Turkvision Song Contest 2014
On 25 September 2014 it was confirmed that Albania would make their official debut at the 2014 Song Contest to be held in Kazan, Tatarstan. For a short period of time it appeared that Albania had withdrawn from the contest, the official website Turkvizyon.tv removed all mention of Albania from their website. On 12 November 2014 it was confirmed by Xhoi that she was still participating and that she would be singing "Zjarr dhe ajër", though the song was later partially translated into Turkish for the contest as "Hava ve Ates". She finished in nineteenth place, achieving a score of 154 points, and therefore failed to qualify for the grand final.

Turkvision Song Contest 2015
As the official website published the preliminary participants list for 2015, Albania was not among them, on 7 November 2015 it was confirmed that Albania would participate in the contest for a second year, it was announced that Xhoi Bejko and Visar Rexhepi would represent Albania in Istanbul. Xhoi Bejko and Visar Rexhepi represented Albania at the contest in Istanbul with the song "Adı hasret" At the contest, they finished in eighth place, achieving 154 points.

Turkvision Song Contest 2020
Albania initially confirmed their participation at the 2020 contest with Rovena Stefa and the song "Zjarr". However, for unknown reasons, Stefa withdrew and was replaced by Ilire Ismajli, who performed the song "Përsëri." She finished in nineteenth place, achieving 171 points.

Participation overview

Related involvement

Jurors

See also
Albania in the Eurovision Song Contest – A song contest organised by the European Broadcasting Union (EBU).
Albania in the Eurovision Young Dancers – A competition organised by the EBU for younger dancers aged between 16 and 21.
Albania in the Junior Eurovision Song Contest – A song contest for children, organised by the EBU.

References

 
Countries in the Turkvision Song Contest